Jonas Svensson may refer to:

Jonas Svensson (tennis) (born 1966), Swedish former tennis player
Jonas Svensson (bandy) (born 1983), Swedish bandy player
Jonas Svensson (footballer) (born 1993), Norwegian footballer